Lillian Gertrude Michael (June 1, 1911 – December 31, 1964) was an American film, stage and television actress.

Biography
Michael was born in Talladega, Alabama to Carl H. Michael and his spouse. She graduated from Talladega High school at the age of 14. In her youth, she played piano and organ, and she began Little Theatres in two communities. She became a singer on the radio.

Michael attended the University of Alabama, where she studied law, and Converse College, Spartanburg, South Carolina, pursuing a study of music. Then she went to the Cincinnati Conservatory of Music to continue studying music. Her work there earned her a scholarship for studying five years in Italy.

In 1929 in Cincinnati she made her stage debut in the Stuart Walker stock theater company. She subsequently appeared on Broadway in Rachel Crothers' Caught Wet (1931). She entered the movies playing Richard Arlen's fiancée in Wayward (1932), but her best-remembered role is probably either as Rita Ross in Murder at the Vanities (1934), one of the last pre-Code films, in which she sang an ode to marijuana ("Sweet Marijuana"), or as Alica Hatton, the snooty society girl in the Mae West comedy I'm No Angel (1933).

In 1937, Michael returned to the stage at the Cape Play House in Dennis, Massachusetts, with the lead in Damn Deborah.

Among her television appearances, Michael was seen on Fireside Theater eleven times between 1950 and 1955 and three times on Schlitz Playhouse. She also made a guest appearance on Perry Mason in 1958 as Helen Rucker in "The Case of the Sun Bather's Diary".

Personal life

Michael had an affair with writer Paul Cain (aka Peter Ruric). After they broke up, Cain, in his novel, Fast One, based the character of the alcoholic lover on Michael.

Michael died on December 31, 1964, aged 53, in her Hollywood home.

Filmography

Film

 Wayward (1932) - Mary Morton
 Unashamed (1932) - Marjorie
 Sailor Be Good (1933) - Kay Whitney
 A Bedtime Story (1933) - Louise
 Night of Terror (1933) - Sarah Rinehart
 Ann Vickers (1933) - Mona Dolphin
 I'm No Angel (1933) - Alicia Hatton
 Cradle Song (1933) - Sister Marcella
 Search for Beauty (1934) - Jean Strange
 Bolero (1934) - Lady D'Argon
 George White's Scandals (1934) - Miss Lee
 Hold That Girl (1934)  - Dorothy Lamont
 I Believed in You (1934) - Pamela Banks
 The Witching Hour (1934) - Margaret Price
 Murder at the Vanities (1934) - Rita Ross
 Murder on the Blackboard (1934) - Jane Davis
 The Notorious Sophie Lang (1934) - Sophie Lang
 Cleopatra (1934) - Calpurnia
 Menace (1934) - Helen Chalmers
 Father Brown, Detective (1934) - Evelyn Fischer
 It Happened in New York (1935) - Vania Nardi
 Four Hours to Kill! (1935) - Mrs. Sylvia Temple
 The Last Outpost (1935) - Rosemary
 Woman Trap (1936) - Barbara 'Buff' Andrews
 Till We Meet Again (1936) - Elsa Duranyi
 Forgotten Faces (1936) - Cleo Ashton
 The Return of Sophie Lang (1936) - Sophie Lang aka Ethel Thomas
 Second Wife (1936) - Virginia Howard
 Make Way for a Lady (1936) - Miss Eleanor Emerson
 Mr. Dodd Takes the Air (1937) - Jessica Stafford
 Sophie Lang Goes West (1937) - Sophie Lang
 Just like a Woman (1938) - Ann Heston
 Star of the Circus (1938) - Yester
 Hidden Power (1939) - Virginia Garfield
 Parole Fixer (1940) - Collette Menthe
 The Farmer's Daughter (1940) - Clarice Sheldon
 I Can't Give You Anything But Love, Baby (1940) - Magda Delys
 Slightly Tempted (1940) - Duchess
 Prisoner of Japan (1942) - Toni Chase
 Behind Prison Walls (1943) - Elinor Cantwell
 Women in Bondage (1943) - District Director Schneider
 Faces in the Fog (1944) - Nora Brooks
 Three's a Crowd (1945) - Sophie Whipple
 Allotment Wives (1945) - Gladys Smith
 Club Havana (1945) - Hetty - Powder Room Attendant
 That Wonderful Urge (1948) - Mrs. Whitson (uncredited)
 Flamingo Road (1949) - Millie
 Caged (1950) - Georgia Harrison
 Darling, How Could You! (1951) - Mrs. Rossiter
 Bugles in the Afternoon (1952) - May
 No Escape (1953) - Olga Valerie Lewis
 Women's Prison (1955) - Chief Matron Sturgess
 The Continental Twist (1961) - Letitia Clunker
 The Outsider (1961) - Clubwoman (uncredited) (final film role)

Television
 Schlitz Playhouse of Stars (3 episodes, 1952–1957) - the Duchess
 Crown Theatre with Gloria Swanson (1 episode, 1954) - Lisa Jenssen
 Cavalcade of America (1 episode, 1953) - Major Pauline Cushman
 Meet Corliss Archer (1 episode, 1954) - Mrs. Wilson
 The Pepsi-Cola Playhouse (1 episode, 1954) - Coralee
 Private Secretary (1 episode, 1954) - Hollywood Star
 The Ford Television Theatre (1 episode, 1954) - Belle
 Four Star Playhouse (1 episode, 1955) - Fanny
 Cameo Theatre (1 episode, 1955)
 The New Adventures of Charlie Chan (1 episode, 1957) - Joyce Fenton
 The 20th Century-Fox Hour (1 episode, 1957) - Kate
 Perry Mason (1 episode, 1958) - Helen Rucker
 Sea Hunt (1 episode, 1961) - Mrs. Friedrich

References

External links

 
 
 
 Gertrude Michael at Virtual History

1911 births
1964 deaths
University of Alabama alumni
American film actresses
American stage actresses
American television actresses
Actresses from Cincinnati
People from Greater Los Angeles
Actresses from Alabama
People from Talladega, Alabama
20th-century American actresses
20th-century American singers
20th-century American women singers